Harker Run can refer to:

Harker Run (West Virginia)
Harker's Run (Ohio)